Rizavdi Romanovich Edilov (born 26 June 1988) is a former Russian professional footballer.

Club career
He made his professional debut in the Russian First Division in 2006 for FC Terek Grozny.

External links

References

1988 births
Living people
Russian footballers
Association football goalkeepers
FC Akhmat Grozny players
Russian Premier League players